Neoepicorsia is a genus of moths of the family Crambidae.

Species
Neoepicorsia claudiusalis (Walker, 1859)
Neoepicorsia confusa Munroe, 1964
Neoepicorsia daucalis Munroe, 1964
Neoepicorsia furvulalis Munroe, 1978
Neoepicorsia fuscalis Munroe, 1978
Neoepicorsia submundalis (Dognin, 1905)
Neoepicorsia tuisalis (Schaus, 1912)

References

Natural History Museum Lepidoptera genus database

Pyraustinae
Crambidae genera
Taxa named by Eugene G. Munroe